Ellen Rose Noble (born December 3, 1995) is an American professional racing cyclist, who currently rides for Trek Factory Racing in cyclo-cross and mountain bike racing. In 2019, Noble was named as part of UCI Women's Team  for the women's road cycling season.

Major results

2018 
 2nd United States National Cyclo-cross Championships
 3rd United States National Cyclo-Cross Championships

2017 
 2nd UCI U23 Cyclo-cross World Championships
1st U23 United States National Cyclo-cross Championships

2016 
1st U23 United States National Cyclo-cross Championships

References

External links
 

1995 births
Living people
American female cyclists
People from Kennebunkport, Maine
21st-century American women